Big Brother Brasil 5 was the fifth season of Big Brother Brasil which premiered January 10, 2005 with the season finale airing March 29, 2005 on the Rede Globo television network.

The show was produced by Endemol Globo and presented by news reporter Pedro Bial and directed by Jose Bonifacio Brasil de Oliveira. The prize award was R$1 million without tax allowances.

The winner was 30-year-old college professor Jean Wyllys from Alagoinhas, Bahia. He was the first housemate to come out during the show.

Overview
There were fourteen housemates competing for the grand prize. The season lasted 79 days, a decrease of almost one week over the previous season. The season introduced the Z$ Estaleca (currency of the house). For the first time since the first season, the Finale Night featured a Final Three rather than a Final Two. Aline Cristina is the currently tied with Big Brother Spain 11's Nagore for the highest eviction percentage in the world, 95%.

Reunion Show
The reunion was hosted by Pedro Bial and aired on April 3, 2005. All the housemates, except Marielza, attended. Tati Pink ended up winning the "Big Boss Prize" which awarded a new Fiat Stilo. She won over Marcos with 76% of the fans' vote. This was the last season that air a reunion.

After the Show
Grazielli Massafera became a very popular celebrity and starred in a 2006 Rede Globo's prime-time soap opera entitled Páginas da Vida. She also starred another soap-operas like Desejo Proibido, Negócio da China (protagonist) and Tempos Modernos (main antagonist).

Jean Wyllys was elected federal congressman for Socialism and Liberty Party (PSOL) in 2010 and was re-elected in 2014. He is famous for being openly gay and gay rights activist. His most famous opponent is the right-wing conservative congressman Jair Bolsonaro.

Housemates
(ages stated at time of contest)

Future Appearances

In 2015, Grazielli Massafera appeared on Big Brother Brasil 15 as a host in a HOH competition.

Voting history

 Note 1:  Extra surprise housemates Marcos and Marielza entered the house on Day 4 and the public was able to choose one of them to be immune. Marielza won the vote with 54%.
 Note 2: Marielza had to leave the House after a health problem.
 Note 3: Big Brother revealed to the audience that the winner of the ninth and final Power of Immunity competition, instead of give immunity to someone else, would win the immunity. Sammy won the PoI on day 68, but the housemates were only informed about the twist during the live nominations on day 70.
 Note 4: With Alan immune as HoH, Sammy as saved by the Power of Immunity and Tati Pink as the HoH's nominee, Jean and Grazielli did not cast votes during nominations as they could only vote for each other. After a 1-1 nominations vote between Jean and Grazielli, Alan, as Head of Household, had the casting vote and chose Jean to be the second nominee.
 Note 5: Sammy won the final Head of Household and nominated Alan for eviction. Since Grazielli and Jean's votes would cancel each other out, only Alan was eligible to nominate. He chose Jean to be the second nominee.

References

External links
 Big Brother Brasil 5
 Terra: BBB5

2005 Brazilian television seasons
05